

Critical Internet infrastructure is a collective term for all hardware and software systems that constitute essential components in the operation of the Internet.

Background
Several studies and events have helped to define the scope of critical Internet infrastructure. In August 2013, Internet infrastructure experts including Yuval Shavitt, Bill Woodcock, Rossella Mattioli, Thomas Haeberlen, Ethan Katz-Bassett and Roland Dobbins convened for six days at Schloss Dagstuhl to refine the academic and policy understanding of critical Internet infrastructure, producing a number of papers in the process. In 2017, the Global Commission on the Stability of Cyberspace undertook a global survey of Internet infrastructure experts in order to assess the degree of consensus on what constituted critical Internet infrastructure, producing a Definition of the Public Core which has since been used by the OECD and others as a standardized description of the principal elements of Internet critical infrastructure. In addition to these globally-applicable findings, nationally-specific definitions have been made by individual governments, for example by the US Government Accountability Office in 2006 and the US White House in 2013.

GCSC definition
The report of the GCSC Critical Infrastructure Assessment Working Group has summarized the results of their survey in a comprehensive definition of Critical Internet infrastructure, which includes the following elements:
 Packet routing and forwarding
 Naming and numbering systems 
 Security and identity protection
 Physical transmission media

See also
 Critical infrastructure
 Global Commission on the Stability of Cyberspace

References

Internet terminology
Internet architecture